Cranford is an episodic novel by the English writer Elizabeth Gaskell. It first appeared in instalments in the magazine Household Words, then was published with minor revisions as a book with the title Cranford  in 1853.  The work slowly became popular and from the start of the 20th century it saw a number of dramatic treatments for the stage, the radio and TV.

Background
The fictional Cranford is based on the small Cheshire town of Knutsford in which Elizabeth Gaskell grew up. She had already drawn on her childhood memories for an article published in America, "The Last Generation in England" (1849), and for the town of Duncombe which featured in her extended story "Mr. Harrison's Confessions" (1851). These accounts of life in a country town and the old-fashioned class snobbery prevailing there were carried over into what was originally intended simply as another story, published as "Our Society in Cranford" in the magazine Household Words in December 1851. Seeing the possibilities of a longer work in the piece, which eventually formed the first two chapters of her novel, Charles Dickens, the magazine's editor, encouraged the author to write more episodes.

Thereafter Mrs Gaskell added eight further episodes over the next 18 months, with an eight-month gap between the sections ending at what is now chapter 8 (written between December 1851 to April 1852) and the later sections (written between January to May, 1853). During this period, she was also engaged in writing the three volume novel Ruth, which was published in January 1853. Cranford itself soon followed its serialisation as a single-volume book published by Chapman & Hall in June 1853, with a second printing in August and a US edition that same month. Following a third UK printing in 1855 came a French translation in 1856 and a German translation in 1867. However, the book was not widely reviewed in Britain and it was not until the 1890s that it became really popular.

One of the routes to the novel's growth in popularity was the policy of publishers to increase sales by providing lower-priced illustrated editions. The first of these in Cranford's case was issued by Smith, Elder & Co in 1864 with illustrations by George du Maurier, whose approach was to interpret scenes in contemporary terms. There was a change of emphasis in Hugh Thomson's 1891 illustrations, where the Cranford interiors and styles of dress are pictured as closer to the preindustrial Regency period of Elizabeth Gaskell's memories. There was also an emotional shift from Du Maurier's psychological but compassionate depiction of people in limited circumstances to a greater emphasis on humour and sentimentality, a change of approach which was to prove influential on other illustrators for decades to come.

Structure
The work has no real plot, but is what The Athenaeum described as "a collection of sketches" on its appearance, affectionately delineating people and customs that were already becoming anachronisms. There it is the continuity of the characters involved that provides unity, rather than a linear narrative. Indeed, the perspective moves back and forth in time as past memories are introduced to account for the present. Necessary distancing is provided by the narrator, Mary Smith, whose point of view is that of a younger woman from a very different background simply reporting her experiences. As the daughter of a businessman living in Manchester (which she calls Drumble in the novel) she only visits Cranford occasionally, a device which is made to account for the episodic nature of the narration.

In reality, Manchester was now Mrs Gaskell's own place of residence after her marriage. But the difference between country town and industrial city is as much a function of time as of distance. Many of the personal details and stories, including that of the cow dressed in flannel, are based on remembered fact that had taken place years before. Acknowledging this in a letter to John Ruskin, Mrs Gaskell commented that she had included less than she knew for fear of being thought to exaggerate. Moreover, the author's own preoccupation with class in her fiction is here refracted through the glass of a town out of step with what was developing beyond its parish boundaries. In Cranford "the system that, ushered in by the growing industrial and urban economy, was coming to replace the traditional system of rank", was slower to arrive than the railway.

In the view of Jenny Uglow, the novel chronicles a society in transition, moving from one where consideration of rank was the foremost regulator of behaviour and social relations to a more humane emphasis on responding to individual need. "The small social group begins to encompass those hitherto banned on grounds of class" as the female arbiters of society grow from their initial illusion that their conservative values are effective guardians of gentility to a realisation that "kindness and concern for each other" are a more effective basis of mutual support.

Synopsis

The episodes described as taking place in Cranford were originally published under eight separate titles. The first, titled Our Society in Cranford and comprising the first two chapters of the eventual novel, introduces a female society of "Amazons", mostly widows or elderly unmarried women, living in genteel poverty and concealing the fact under what they call "elegant economy". These visit each other's houses according to a restrictive code of rules overseen by those among them most highly connected socially by birth or marriage. The arrival of Captain Brown, retired from the military and now a railway employee, disrupts their small world by his unguarded references to taboo subjects. Just as he gains their respect by his kindness and openness, he is killed rescuing a child from being run over by a train. His sickly elder daughter dies soon after and Jesse Brown is then freed to marry an old military admirer.

A Love Affair at Cranford (the eventual chapters 3–4) begins after the elder Miss Jenkyns' death, when her sister Matty is flustered by having to host a visit from her cousin, Major Jenkyns. Martha is hired as a new servant, whom Mary Smith trains, and the two later encounter Mr Holbrook in the town. Miss Matty recounts how she was prevented from marrying him when young for reasons of social status but gladly accepts an invitation to dinner in his house. Shortly afterwards he takes a trip to Paris and dies on his return and Matty goes into mourning.

Memory at Cranford (chapters 5–6), in which the reading of old family letters tells the story of Matty's parents. She then recalls the closeness between herself and her brother Peter and how a piece of mischief so enraged their father that he beat his son in public. Peter then ran away from home and was last heard of leaving as a soldier to fight in India.

Visiting at Cranford (chapters 7–8) begins with Betty Barker's inviting the Cranford ladies to tea, at which social rules are broken but forgiven after all are persuaded to drink cherry brandy and Mrs Jamieson announces the coming stay of her elder brother's widow, Lady Glenmire. Tension follows the snobbery of Mrs Jamieson over this relationship, which is deflated when Lady Glenmire shows herself very approachable at a party given in her honour.

The Great Cranford Panic (chapters 9–11). The town is impressed by the arrival of the mysterious Signor Brunoni and attend his conjuring show. Gossip afterwards connects him with a spate of robberies that terrify the ladies. But he is later discovered lying ill in lodgings and turns out to be an ex-soldier named Samuel Brown. His wife then describes their time in India and how her little daughter was nursed to health there by a kind Englishman called Jenkyns. Mary Smith wonders whether this might have been Matty's lost brother and decides to make enquiries.

Stopped payment at Cranford (chapter 12–13). Mr Hoggins is called in to look after Signor Brunoni, where Lady Glenmire meets and becomes engaged to him. While out shopping, Matty hears the rumour that her bank may stop payment on its notes and, as an investor there, insists on paying in coin for a customer's purchase. The bankruptcy is confirmed next day.

Friends in need  (chapter 14). Though Matty will soon be penniless and can no longer afford a maid, Martha refuses to leave. Instead she proposes marrying Jem Hearn and taking Matty in as her lodger. Meanwhile, Miss Pole calls a meeting of the ladies and they agree to sacrifice some of their own income to support Matty, while getting Mary's father to pretend that it comes as a return on her investments.

A happy return to Cranford (chapters 15–16)
After a successful sale of her belongings, Matty's house is taken over by Jem and Martha. There she uses the parlour to trade in tea at Mary's suggestion. But this arrangement does not last for long since Peter arrives after Mary has contacted him, having made a fortune as a planter in India. Matty is delighted and Peter makes sure she remains in the esteem of the "Amazons" by becoming a favourite among them as a peace-maker and teller of tall stories.

Characters
 Mary Smith – The narrator, a frequent visitor of the Jenkyns family and Miss Pole. 
 Miss Deborah Jenkyns – The domineering elder daughter of the former rector.
 Miss Matty Jenkyns – The rector's younger daughter.
 Peter Jenkyns – The son of the family, who ran away from home and eventually settled in India.
 Miss Pole – The town gossip, Miss Matty's friend. 
 The Honourable Mrs Jamieson – As daughter of a governor and the widowed daughter-in-law of a baron, she is considered Cranford's social arbiter.
 Mrs Forrester – Another widow who, as an officer's daughter and the widow of a major, is accepted into the Cranford social circle.
 Miss Fitz-Adam – Mr Hoggins' sister, a wealthy widow who is regarded by Mrs Jamieson as her social inferior.
 Lady Glenmire – Mrs. Jamieson's widowed sister-in-law, who does not share her social prejudices.
 Betty Barker – A retired milliner to the gentry, once employed as a maid by Mrs Jamieson.
 Captain Brown – A half-pay army captain, who comes to live at Cranford with his two daughters.
 Thomas Holbrook – Miss Pole's cousin, a successful farmer who was once Miss Matty's suitor. 
 Dr Hoggins – As the Cranford surgeon he is of uncertain social status and is discriminated against because of his "vulgar" surname.
 Mr Smith –  A wealthy Drumble businessman and Mary's father.
 Martha – Miss Matty's devoted maid.
 Jem Hearn – A joiner, Martha's fiancé.  
 Mr Mulliner – Mrs. Jamieson's butler. 
 Signor Brunoni – Stage name of the travelling magician, a former soldier.
 Signora Brunoni – His wife, who accompanied him when his regiment was sent to India.

Sequels and adaptations
  
Elizabeth Gaskell had not done entirely with Knutsford with the publication of Cranford. Thomas Higgins, an 18th-century highwayman and former inhabitant of the town, was made the subject of "The Squire’s Story", published in the Christmas 1853 number of Household Words, although it was there set in the fictitious Derbyshire town of Barford. Then years later she made the arrival of the hoop skirt the subject of an additional farcical episode in "The Cage at Cranford", published by Dickens in his new magazine All the Year Round in November 1863.

Theatrical adaptations of the novel began at the turn of the century, the first few of which were produced in the US. Among these were Alice Byington's Cranford Dames, a play in five scenes (New York, 1900), and Marguerite Merington's Cranford: A Play, a three-act comedy set in the time of William IV, (New York 1905). Some of the later British examples were merely dramatic episodes and included "The Bank Breaks" by Arthur Phosphor Mallam (1872–1948), based on chapters 13–15 (1912); Guy Pertwee's "A Cranford Card Party" (1913); Harry Brighouse's 'Cranford sketch', "Followers" (1915); and Amy M. Robertson's "The Panic from Cranford" (1930), based on chapter 10. 1930 also saw the tangential 'play for boys', Higgins, the Highwayman of Cranford, by Ronald Gow.

In America the novel was adapted for NBC radio in 1946. Martyn Coleman's three-act play for theatre, first produced in 1951, was adapted for British television that year. Subsequently, a four-part television adaptation from the novel was broadcast by BBC in 1972. There was also a British musical based on the novel staged in 1975 and another broadcast by Thames Television in 1976. In 2007 the five-part television series that appeared under the title Cranford was in reality elided with three other works by Gaskell: My Lady Ludlow, Mr. Harrison's Confessions and The Last Generation in England. A sequel, Return to Cranford, was broadcast in 2009 in the UK and 2010 in the US.

Bibliography
Dinah Birch, introduction to OUP Cranford (2011)
Esther Alice Chadwick, Mrs Gaskell: Haunts, Homes, and Stories (London 1910)
Peter Keating, "Introduction" to the Penguin edition of Cranford (1976) 
Thomas Recchio, Elizabeth Gaskell’s Cranford: a publishing history, Ashgate 2009

References

External links

 
 
 
 

 

1853 British novels
Novels by Elizabeth Gaskell
Novels first published in serial form
Works originally published in Household Words
Victorian novels
Novels set in Cheshire
British novels adapted into television shows